Maja Åström (born 14 December 1982) is a Swedish footballer. She most recently played as a goalkeeper for Damallsvenskan club Tyresö FF and once played for the Sweden women's national football team in 2001.

Club career 

Åström played for Djurgården/Älvsjö in the 2005 UEFA Women's Cup Final, where they lost 5–1 on aggregate to Turbine Potsdam.

International career 

On 11 March 2001, Åström was capped by the senior Sweden team in a 4–1 Algarve Cup win over Portugal. Following an injury to Sofia Lundgren, Åström was drafted into Sweden's squad for UEFA Women's Euro 2005 as the third choice goalkeeper.

Personal life 

Åström is openly lesbian.

Honours

Club 

 Djurgården/Älvsjö
 Damallsvenskan (1): 2004

References

External links 

 National team profile

Living people
1982 births
Swedish women's footballers
Sweden women's international footballers
Damallsvenskan players
Tyresö FF players
Djurgårdens IF Fotboll (women) players
Swedish LGBT sportspeople
Lesbian sportswomen
LGBT association football players
Bälinge IF players
AIK Fotboll (women) players
People from Avesta Municipality
Women's association football goalkeepers
Sportspeople from Dalarna County